The Domain of the Swiss Federal Institutes of Technology (ETH Domain, German: ETH-Bereich, French: Domaine des Écoles polytechniques fédérales) is a union of Swiss governmental universities and research institutions. It primarily consists of the following institutions:

Federal institutes of technology
 Swiss Federal Institute of Technology in Zurich (ETHZ)
 Swiss Federal Institute of Technology in Lausanne (EPFL)

Federal research institutes
 Paul Scherrer Institute (PSI)
 Swiss Federal Laboratories for Materials Science and Technology (Empa)
 Swiss Federal Institute of Aquatic Science and Technology (Eawag)
 Swiss Federal Institute for Forest, Snow and Landscape Research (WSL)

Competence centers
 CCEM (Energy & Mobility)
 CCES (Environment & Sustainability)
 CCMX (Materials Science & Technology)
 NCCBI (Biomedical Imaging)

ETH Board 

The ETH Domain is governed by the strategic unit Board of the Swiss Federal Institutes of Technology (ETH Board).

See also 
 Science and technology in Switzerland
 List of institutions using the term "institute of technology" or "polytechnic"

Notes and references